Purple Rain may refer to:

Purple Rain (film), a 1984 film starring Prince
Purple Rain (album), the soundtrack album by American recording artist Prince for the film
"Purple Rain" (song), the title track of the album by American recording artist Prince
Purple Rain Tour, Prince's 1984–1985 concert tour
Purple Rain (band), a South Korean rock band
Purple Rain (drink), an alcoholic cocktail
purplera1n, a jailbreaking utility
Purple Rain Protest, a 1989 anti-apartheid protest in Cape Town

See also
Purple Reign (disambiguation)
Purple Haze (disambiguation)